Gueye or Guèye is a surname. Notable people with the surname include:

Abbas Gueye (1913–1999), Senegalese politician
Abdou Latif Guèye (1956–2008), Senegalese politician
Alioune Gueye (born 1987), Senegalese footballer
Amdy Gueye (born 1980), Senegalese footballer
Awa Gueye (born 1978), Senegalese women's basketball player
Babacar Gueye (born 1986), Senegalese footballer
Cheikh Gueye (born 1986), Senegalese footballer
Ibrahima Gueye (born 1978), Senegalese footballer
Idrissa Gueye (born 1989), Senegalese footballer
Lamine Guèye (1891–1968), Senegalese politician
Lamine Guèye (skier) (born 1960), Senegalese skier
Magaye Gueye (born 1990), French footballer
Mamadou Gueye (jumper) (born 1986), Senegalese athlete
Médoune Gueye (born 1982), French footballer
Mouhamadou Gueye (born 1998), American basketball player
Moussa Gueye (born 1989), Senegalese footballer
Moussa Khoume Gueye (born 1985), Senegalese footballer
Ndiatte Gueye, Senegalese sprint canoeist
Papa Gueye (born 1984), Senegalese footballer
Youssouf Gueye (1928–1988), Mauritanian writer
Zakaria Gueye (born 1986), Senegalese footballer